The Rajhans-class patrol vessels are series of five patrol vessels built by Garden Reach Shipbuilders & Engineers, Kolkata for Indian Coast Guard
.

Design
They are powered by Two 38 TB92 MTU diesels engines generating  and driving two propellers. The Rajhans-class vessels have an accommodation for a crew of 28 enlisted sailors. The hull's design is essentially the same as of Seaward Defence Boats (SDB) Mk 2 class in service of Indian Navy.

Ships of the class

Specification
Displacement : 200 t
Length : 37.80 m
Beam : 7.50 m
Draught : 1.85 m
Armament : 40 mm 60 cal Bofors Mk 3 AA, 2 single 7.62 mm MG
Electronic Radar : BEL make-1*1245 nav.
Power : 2 MTU 16V538 TB92 diesels,
Propulsion : 2 propeller, 6,820 bh
Range : 1400 nmi at 14 kn
Crew : 28 enlisted

See also

References

External links

Fast attack craft of the Indian Coast Guard
Patrol boat classes
Ships of the Indian Coast Guard